The purpose of co-operative education and co-operative studies, according to the ICA's Statement on the Co-operative Identity, is that Co-operative societies "provide education and training for their members, elected representatives, managers, and employees so they can contribute effectively to the development of their co-operatives. They inform the general public – particularly young people and opinion leaders – about the nature and benefits of co-operation." As such, it forms the fifth Rochdale Principle. Subfields of this include Co-operative economics, and the History of the cooperative movement. 

In December 2011 a special edition of the Journal of Co-operative Studies was given over to the subject of co-operative learning. Edited by Maureen Breeze, the edition contains 14 articles written by theorists and practitioners of co-operative learning. Contributors include Alan Wilkins (Co-operative Learning: a contextual framework), Nigel Rayment (Co-operative Learning: values into practice), Wendy Jolliffe (Co-operative learning: making it work in the classroom) and Nick Matthews (Teaching About Co-operatives in a UK University Business School).

References

External links
 British Columbia Institute for Co-operative Studies

Cooperative movement